Luther Vandross is the twelfth studio album by American singer Luther Vandross. It was released by J Records on June 19, 2001 in the United States. His debut with the label after a brief stint with Virgin Records on I Know (1998), it marked a departure for Vandross who reunited with frequent collaborators Nat Adderley, Jr. and Marcus Miller to work on some songs, but also recruited a wider range of contemporary producers such as Warryn Campbell, Shep Crawford, Eddie F., Darren Lighty, Soulshock, and The Underdogs to contribute material. 

The album was released to positive reception from music critics, who called it Vandross' best effort in a decade. His rendition of  the 1962 Chuck Jackson song "Any Day Now" received a nomination for Best Traditional R&B Vocal Performance at the 2003 Grammy Awards. Upon release, Luther Vandross debuted at number six on the US Billboard 200, selling 136,000 copies, his best first week sales yet. The album produced three singles, including "Take You Out" which reached the top 30 on the Billboard Hot 100 and topped the Adult R&B Songs chart.

Critical reception

AllMusic editor Jose F. Promis found that Luther Vandross was "a return to form," and ranked the album "as the singer's best since 1991's critically and commercially lauded Power of Love." He further called it "the singer's most engaging, exciting, and compelling album in years; [it] shows Vandross in step with changing times, all the while still managing to hold on to the essence of what made him so famous in the first place." People magazine called Luther Vandross "vintage Vandross" and wrote: "With his new disc, Vandross has finally come up with a collection of songs worthy of his silky, elastic tenor. Sounding as robust as ever despite having dropped 120 lbs. since his last album [...] Vandross works his seductive spells on sensitive slow jams [...]." Entertainment Weeklys Robert Cherry felt that "Vandross doesn’t need to rely on expletives to stimulate a response. Armed with G-rated ballads and a bevy of hot producers who step aside to let the man do his thang, Vandross and his caramel-smooth croon could spark yet another baby boom."

Commercial performance
Luther Vandross debuted and peaked at number six on the US Billboard 200, selling 136,000 copies in its first week. It marked Vandross' best chart showing since Billboard began using SoundScan to track sales in 1991. On Billboards component charts, the album reached number two on the Top R&B/Hip-Hop Albums chart, becoming his twelfth solo album to reach the top ten. In total, Luther Vandross sold 1.2 million copies. The album was eventually certified platinum by the Recording Industry Association of America (RIAA) for the shipment of over 1 million copies in the United States.

Track listing

Charts

Weekly charts

Year-end charts

Certifications

Release history

References

2001 albums
J Records albums
Luther Vandross albums
Albums produced by Clive Davis